Meriwest Credit Union began on May 5, 1961, when a group of IBM employees organized the IBM San Jose Employees Federal Credit Union. In 1975 the official name changed to Pacific IBM Employees Federal Credit Union. In 1999 Pacific IBM became Meriwest Credit Union. Today, membership that was once only available to IBM employees and their families, are now available to anyone who lives or works in the Greater Bay Area of Northern California or in Tucson, Arizona. Today Meriwest Credit Union has over 72,000 members and $1.5 billion in total assets.

Community relationship
Meriwest Credit Union has a long history of providing support to its local communities by partnering with local charities and non-profit organizations, as well as providing free educational resources.

Membership requirements
At least one of these options listed below will apply:
 Live, work, or attend school in select counties within the Greater Bay Area of California, or Tucson, Arizona.
 Employee of a participating Meriwest Credit Union member company.
 Relative of or reside with a current member of Meriwest Credit Union.

References

External links

Credit unions based in California
Banks established in 1961